Christine Helen Foyer (born 3 October 1952) is professor of plant science at the University of Birmingham, Birmingham, UK. She is President Elect of the Association of Applied Biologists, the General Secretary of the Federation of European Societies of Plant Biologists, an elected Board Member of the American Society of Plant Biologists and a Member of the French Academy of Agriculture.   She has published and co-authored many papers on related subjects.

Foyer's name is included in the "Foyer–Halliwell–Asada" pathway, a cellular process of hydrogen peroxide metabolism in plants and animals and named for the three principal discoverers.

Education

Foyer attended Portsmouth Polytechnic (now the University of Portsmouth) from 1971–74, achieving a BSc with Class II, Division I Honours in Biology (CNAA).

From 1974–77 she attended the Department of Biochemistry, King's College London where she completed her PhD.  During this time Foyer also attended a course on immunology at Chelsea College, London.

In 1998 Foyer was elected a Fellow of the Institute of Biology.

Work

Foyer researches plant growth regulation and development under optimal circumstances and in conditions of stress (caused by, for example, lack of water, low temperatures, high light, infestation by aphids). Her work has a special focus on how cellular reduction/oxidation (redox), homeostasis and signalling interact with phytohormone–mediated pathways, particularly involving abscisic acid, auxin and strigolactones. Her research is centered on ascorbate and glutathione as key regulators of plant responses to stress and on how redox processes associated with primary metabolism particularly photosynthesis and respiration regulate gene expression.

The department addresses research problems of intrinsic scientific interest but is always mindful of the needs of agriculture and food security. In addition to undertaking fundamental studies on model plant species such as Arabidopsis thaliana, research in the Foyer lab includes work which relates the research findings, particularly in relation to enhancing stress tolerance, to crop species such as soybean, maize and barley.

Selected publications
Books
 Identification and Application of Phenotypic and Molecular Markers for Abiotic Stress Tolerance in Soybean,  Berhanu Amsalu Fenta, Belen Marquez Garcia, Christine H. Foyer, Karl J. Kunert, Magdeleen DuPlessis, Urte Schluter: 2011. INTECH Open Access Publisher: 
 A New Era in Plant Metabolism Research Reveals a Bright Future for Bio-fortification and Human Nutrition, Christine H Foyer, Dean Dellapenna,  Dominique Van der Straeten: 2006
 Plant Carbon-nitrogen Interactions from Rhizophere to Plant, Caroline Bowsher, Christine H Foyer, Society for Experimental Biology: Oxford University Press: 2004.
 Molecular Physiology: Engineering Crops for Hostile Environments, Martin A Parry, Christine H Foyer, Brian Forde: Oxford University Press: 2000. ISBN
 Causes of Photooxidative Stress and Amelioration of Defense Systems in Plants, Christine H Foyer, Philip M Mullineaux: CRC Press: 1994. 
 Photosynthesis,  Christine H Foyer, Kreiger Publishing Co.: 1991 
Research articles

References

External links
 Video of Christine Foyer explaining her work.

1952 births
Living people
20th-century British biologists
20th-century British women scientists
21st-century British biologists
21st-century British women scientists
Alumni of the University of Portsmouth
Alumni of King's College London
British women biologists
Academics of the University of Leeds
Fellows of the Royal Society of Biology